A winepress is a device used to extract juice from crushed grapes during wine making. There are a number of different styles of presses that are used by wine makers but their overall functionality is the same. Each style of press exerts controlled pressure in order to free the juice from the fruit (most often grapes). The pressure must be controlled, especially with grapes, in order to avoid crushing the seeds and releasing a great deal of undesirable tannins into the wine. Wine was being made at least as long ago as 4000 BC; in 2011, a winepress was unearthed in Armenia with red wine dated 6,000 years old.

Press types

Basket
A basket press consists of a large basket filled with the crushed grapes. Pressure is applied through a plate that is forced down onto the fruit. The mechanism to lower the plate is often either a screw or a hydraulic device. The juice flows through openings in the basket. The basket style press was the first type of mechanized press to be developed, and its basic design has not changed in nearly 1000 years.

Horizontal screw
A horizontal screw press works using the same principle as the basket press. Instead of a plate being brought down to put pressure on the grapes, plates from either side of a closed cylinder are brought together to squeeze the grapes. Generally the volume of grapes handled is significantly greater than that of a basket press.

Bladder
A bladder press consists of a large cylinder, closed at each end, into which the fruit is loaded. To press the grapes, a large bladder expands and pushes the grapes against the sides. The juice then flows out through small openings in the cylinder. The cylinder rotates during the process to help homogenize the pressure that is placed on the grapes.

Continuous screw
A continuous screw press differs from the above presses in that it does not process a single batch of grapes at a time. Instead it uses an Archimedes' screw to continuously force grapes up against the wall of the device. Juice is extracted, and the pomace continues through to the end where it is extracted. This style of press is rarely used to produce table wines, and some countries forbid its use for higher quality wines.

Flash release
Flash release is a technique used in winepressing. The technique allows for a better extraction of phenolic compounds.

Gallery

See also
History of the winepress
Grape stomping

References

Food technology
Winemaking